Hans-Wolfgang Heidland (20 July 1912 – 11 January 1992) was a German rower. He competed in the men's eight event at the 1932 Summer Olympics.

References

External links
 

1912 births
1992 deaths
German male rowers
Olympic rowers of Germany
Rowers at the 1932 Summer Olympics
Sportspeople from Koblenz